Linda Karshan (born 1947) is an American artist. Karshan is known for her performance-based abstract drawings.

Her work is included in the collections of the Tate Gallery, London, the Harvard Art Museums and the Walker Art Center, Minneapolis,

In 2021 she donated a significant collection of drawings to the Courtauld Gallery, in the name of her late husband Howard Karshan.

References

1947 births
20th-century American women artists
21st-century American women artists
Living people